The 15th Indian Division was an infantry division of the British Indian Army that saw active service in the First World War.  It served in the Mesopotamian Campaign on the Euphrates Front throughout its existence.  It did not serve in the Second World War, but was reformed at Dehradun in 1964 as part of the post-independence Indian Army.

History

World War I
The division was formed on 7 May 1916 to replace the 12th Indian Division on the Euphrates Front.  It remained on the Euphrates Front until the end of the war.  It took part in the action of As Sahilan (11 September 1916), the Capture of Ramadi (28 and 29 September 1917), the Occupation of Hīt (9 March 1918) and the action of Khan Baghdadi (26 and 27 March 1918).  The division was not attached to either of the army corps operating in Mesopotamia, the I Corps and III Corps.

The division was commanded from formation on 7 May 1916 by Brigadier-General Harry T Brooking.  Brooking was promoted to Major-General on 5 June 1916.

At the end of the war, the division was rapidly run down and it was disbanded in March 1919.
Post Independence 
The division was re-raised on 1 October 1964 at Clement Town, Dehradun under Major General Niranjan Prasad and assigned to XI Corps. The divisional headquarters has been located at Amritsar since 1965.

Order of battle, First World War
The division commanded the following units, although not all of them served at the same time:

12th Indian Brigade
 1/5th Battalion, Queen's (Royal West Surrey Regiment)
 2nd Battalion, 39th Garhwal Rifles
 1st Battalion, 43rd Erinpura Infantry
 90th Punjabis
 128th Machine Gun Company
 12th Light Trench Mortar Battery

34th Indian Brigade
Joined the division on formation and left for the 17th Indian Division in August 1917
 2nd Battalion, Queen's Own (Royal West Kent Regiment)
 31st Punjabis
 1st Battalion, 112th Infantry
 114th Mahrattas
 129th Machine Gun Company

42nd Indian Brigade
 1/4th Battalion, Devonshire Regiment
 1/4th Battalion, Dorsetshire Regiment
 1st Battalion, 5th Gurkha Rifles (Frontier Force)
 2nd Battalion, 5th Gurkha Rifles (Frontier Force)
 2nd Battalion, 6th Gurkha Rifles
 130th Machine Gun Company
 42nd Light Trench Mortar Battery

50th Indian Brigade
Joined from the 17th Indian Division in September 1917
 1st Battalion, Oxfordshire and Buckinghamshire Light Infantry
 6th Jat Light Infantry
 14th King George's Own Ferozepore Sikhs
 24th Punjabis
 1st Battalion, 97th Deccan Infantry
 256th Machine Gun Company
 50th Light Trench Mortar Battery

Divisional Artillery
 VII Mountain Brigade, Indian Mountain Artillery (21st Kohat and 26th Jacob's Mountain Batteries)
 CCXXII Brigade, Royal Field Artillery (375th, 1070th, 1072th, 77th (H) and 429th (H) Batteries)
 CCXV Brigade, Royal Field Artillery (816th, 1087th, 1088th and 524th (H) Batteries}
 Volunteer Battery
 M, N and O Light Trench Mortar Batteries
 X.15 Medium Trench Mortar Battery
 15th Divisional Ammunition Column

Engineers and Pioneers
 4th Field Company, 1st King George's Own Sappers and Miners
 Malerkotla Sappers and Miners, ISF
 448th (Northumbrian) Field Company, Royal Engineers
 450th (Northumbrian) Field Company, Royal Engineers
 451st (Northumbrian) Field Company, Royal Engineers
 15th Division Signal Company, Royal Engineers Signal Service
 48th Pioneers

Divisional troops
 D Squadron 1/1st Hertfordshire Yeomanry (6 August 1917 to May 1918)
 275th Machine Gun Company
 3rd, 19th, 23rd, 24th, 34th, 105th and 108th Combined Field Ambulances, RAMC
 No. 16 (renumbered No. 6) Mobile Veterinary Section, AVC
 15th Division Train, ASC

Battles and engagements during World War I
The division was involved in the following actions:
 Action of As Sahilan (11 September 1916)
 Capture of Ramadi (2829 September 1917)
 Occupation of Hīt (9 March 1918)
 Action of Khan Baghdadi (2627 March 1918)

Indo-Pakistani War of 1965

The division was fully operational on 31 March 1965 and moved to its headquarters in Amritsar by 1 April 1965. It took part in Operation Ablaze and the Battle of Dograi.

The division consisted of 38 Infantry Brigade, 54 Infantry Brigade and 15 Artillery Brigade.  38 Infantry Brigade consisted of 1 Jat, 1/3 Gorkha Rifles and 3 Garhwal Rifles. 54 Infantry Brigade consisted of 3 Jat, 15 Dogra, 13 Punjab. In addition to the two infantry brigades, the division consisted of 14 Horse (Scinde Horse), 60 Heavy Regiment and 71 Field Company. 96 Infantry Brigade, consisting of 6 Kumaon, 7 Punjab and 16 Dogra was initially part of the XI Corps reserve, but subsequently placed under the division's operational command. 50 (Independent) Parachute Brigade was placed under the division on 11 September. It was tasked to capture the road and rail bridges in Jallo area, but suffered heavy casualties during 16 and 17 September and had to be withdrawn. 

The division was given the task to advance on the Grand Trunk Road axis and capture the bridge on the Bambawali-Ravi-Bedian Canal (also called Ichhogil Canal) in Dograi east of Lahore. 3 Jat under Lieutenant Colonel Desmond Hayde captured Dograi on the eastern bank of the Canal on 6 September 1965. The same day, 3 Jat captured the Batapore and Attokeawan localities on the west bank of the Canal. Due to lack of support, the unit had to fall back. 1 Jat managed to reach Bhaini Dhilwan bridge, but could not secure it due to armour and artillery fire and had to withdraw. This bridge was subsequently captured by 96 Infantry Brigade. Following the initial reverses faced by the division, Major General Niranjan Prasad was replaced by Major General Mohindar Singh on 9 September 1965. The period of 11 to 18 September was characterised by a series of unproductive actions. The division subsequently plunged in the battle for the Ichhogil canal with zeal and determination. On 21 and 22 September,  3 Jat of the 54 Brigade captured Dograi. The unit won 3 Maha Vir Chakras, 4 Vir Chakras, 7 Sena Medals, 12 Mention in Dispatches and 11 COAS Commendation Cards.

At the end of the war, 15 Division saw 486 killed (26 Officers, 9 JCOs, 451 ORs), 1569 wounded (60 Officers, 57 JCOs, 1450 ORs, 2 NCEs) and 85 missing (3 Officers, 2 JCOs, 79 ORs, 1 NCE).

Awards and honours
The following regiments won the battle honour Dograi-
14 Horse
3 Jat
15 Dogra
7 Punjab
13 Punjab

During the campaign, four Maha Vir Chakras were awarded for conspicuous bravery- 
Major General Mohinder Singh, GOC 15 Infantry Division
Lieutenant Colonel Desmond E Hayde, Commanding Officer, 3 Jat
Major AR Tyagi (Posthumous), 3 Jat
Captain Kapil Singh Thapa (Posthumous), 3 Jat

Indo-Pakistani War of 1971

The division was under Major General BM Bhattacharjee  during the 1971 war and was responsible for the area between Gurdaspur and the Grand Trunk road opposite Amritsar. It took part in the battles of Dera Baba Nanak and Fatehpur - Burj.

Order of battle 

66 Armoured Regiment  
86 Infantry Brigade 
71 Armoured Regiment (from 14 (Independent) Armoured Brigade)
10 Dogra
1/9 Gorkha Rifles
4/8 Gorkha Rifles
17 Rajput
21 BSF
58 Infantry Brigade (detached from 14 Infantry Division) 
24 Punjab
96 Infantry Brigade
15 Maratha Light Infantry
8 Sikh Light Infantry
54 Infantry Brigade 
2 Sikh
9 Punjab
11 Grenadiers
23 BSF
27 BSF
38 Infantry Brigade
16 Grenadiers
4 Assam
8 Garhwal Rifles
15 Artillery Brigade
42 Field Regiment
175 Field Regiment
177 Field Regiment
74 Medium Regiment
84 Light Regiment
202 Divisional Locating Battery
Additional Artillery Regiments
163 Field Regiment
71 Medium Regiment
76 Medium Regiment
49 AD Regiment (two troops)
3 Air Observation Post Flight
20 Locating Regiment

Awards and honours
15 Infantry Division won numerous gallantry awards during the war. Prominent among them are - 
Param Vishisht Seva Medal awardee-
Major General BM Bhattacharjee 
Maha Vir Chakra awardees-
Battle of Dera Baba Nanak
Brigadier Krishnaswamy Gowri Shankar, Commander of 86 Infantry Brigade
Lieutenant Colonel Narinder Singh Sandhu of 10 Dogra
Captain Devinder Singh Ahlawat of 10 Dogra 
Battle of Burj
Sepoy Pandurang Salunkhe of 15 Maratha Light Infantry
Ranian
Major Basidev Singh Makotia of 9 Punjab
Fathepur
Lieutenant Colonel Harish Chandra Pathak of 8 Sikh Light Infantry
Pul Kanjiri
Lance Naik Shangara Singh of 2 Sikh
Battle Honours
86 Infantry Brigade was awarded the battle honour Dera Baba Nanak.
15 Maratha Light Infantry was awarded the battle honour Burj and the theatre honour Punjab. It was declared as the ‘Best Performing Battalion’ during the 1971 Indo-Pak War in the XI Corps Zone by the GOC, Lieutenant General N. C. Rawlley .
10 Dogra was awarded the battle honour Dera Baba Nanak.
1/9 Gorkha Rifles was awarded the battle honour Dera Baba Nanak and theatre honour Punjab.

Other Operations
Operation Blue Star
Operation Vijay
Operation Parakram

See also

 List of Indian divisions in World War I

Notes

References

Bibliography

External links
 
 British Empire has list of all Indian Army regiments with pictures of their regimental badges.

Divisions of the Indian Army
British Indian Army divisions
Indian World War I divisions
Military units and formations established in 1916